Jerry Zirsanga is an Indian football player  who plays in Midfield position for century-old Kolkata-based club Mohammedan. He played only 5 matches for India but on 5 November 2004, he scored his only international goal against Kuwait and become India's youngest goal scorer aged 16 years 311 days.

Career

Chirag United
Zirsanga started his footballing career during the 2010-11 I-League season with Chirag United SC of the I-League. On 24 December 2010 he scored the lone goal from a Lalkamal Bhowmick pass in the 1-0 home win over HAL in the I-League.

Churchill Brothers
After not adjusting and not playing for Chirag United SC Zirsanga transferred to Churchill Brothers S.C.

Mohammedan Sporting
In 2013 I-League 2nd Division Final Round, he played a vital role in the quest for promotion of the Kolkata-based club. On 8 April, he scored the only goal against the Shillong-based Rangdajied United F.C. to secure a 1-0 win.

Honours

India U20
 South Asian Games Silver medal: 2004

References

1987 births
Living people
Indian footballers
India international footballers
India youth international footballers
I-League players
Mohammedan SC (Kolkata) players
Footballers from Mizoram
Association football midfielders
South Asian Games silver medalists for India
South Asian Games medalists in football